Tadej Apatič (born 7 July 1987 in Murska Sobota) is a Slovenian footballer who plays for Beltinci.

He formerly played for Domžale before joining Sheriff Tiraspol in July 2012.

External links
NZS profile 

1987 births
Living people
People from Murska Sobota
Slovenian footballers
Association football fullbacks
Slovenian PrvaLiga players
NK Domžale players
Slovenian expatriate footballers
Expatriate footballers in Moldova
FC Sheriff Tiraspol players
NK Olimpija Ljubljana (2005) players
Expatriate footballers in Bulgaria
Expatriate footballers in Austria
Slovenian expatriate sportspeople in Austria
Slovenian expatriate sportspeople in Bulgaria
Slovenian expatriate sportspeople in Moldova
PFC Slavia Sofia players
First Professional Football League (Bulgaria) players
Moldovan Super Liga players
Slovenia under-21 international footballers
Slovenia youth international footballers